Powhatan Point is a village in southeastern Belmont County, Ohio, United States, along the Ohio River. The population was 1,461 at the 2020 census. It is part of the Wheeling metropolitan area.

While "Powhatan" likely memorializes the Native-American tribe of the same name, the "Point" in the town's name refers to the confluence between the Captina Creek and the Ohio River. Powhatan Point is the closest town on the Ohio side of Captina Island in the Ohio River.

History
Powhatan Point was platted in 1849. A post office called Powhatan Point has been in operation since 1828.

Geography
Powhatan Point is located at  (39.861785, -80.805702).

Demographics

2010 census
As of the census of 2010, there were 1,592 people, 710 households, and 462 families living in the village. The racial makeup of the village was 98.7% White, 0.4% African American, 0.3% Native American, 0.1% Asian, 0.1% from other races, and 0.6% from two or more races. Hispanic or Latino of any race were 0.3% of the population.

There were 710 households, of which 28.3% had children under the age of 18 living with them, 45.4% were married couples living together, 15.2% had a female householder with no husband present, 4.5% had a male householder with no wife present, and 34.9% were non-families. 30.6% of all households were made up of individuals, and 13.9% had someone living alone who was 65 years of age or older. The average household size was 2.24 and the average family size was 2.74.

The median age in the village was 43.6 years. 21.4% of residents were under the age of 18; 8% were between the ages of 18 and 24; 22.4% were from 25 to 44; 30.6% were from 45 to 64; and 17.5% were 65 years of age or older. The gender makeup of the village was 47.8% male and 52.2% female.

2000 census
As of the census of 2000, there were 1,744 people, 760 households, and 515 families living in the village. The population density was 1,119.7 people per square mile (431.6/km). There were 830 housing units at an average density of 532.9 per square mile (205.4/km). The racial makeup of the village was 98.11% White, 0.57% African American, 0.06% Native American, and 1.26% from two or more races. Hispanic or Latino of any race were 0.23% of the population.

There were 760 households, out of which 27.5% had children under the age of 18 living with them, 52.9% were married couples living together, 11.1% had a female householder with no husband present, and 32.2% were non-families. 28.2% of all households were made up of individuals, and 14.9% had someone living alone who was 65 years of age or older. The average household size was 2.29 and the average family size was 2.78.

In the village, the population was spread out, with 21.3% under the age of 18, 8.5% from 18 to 24, 27.1% from 25 to 44, 25.6% from 45 to 64, and 17.5% who were 65 years of age or older. The median age was 41 years. For every 100 females, there were 90.0 males. For every 100 females age 18 and over, there were 83.8 males.

The median income for a household in the village was $24,875, and the median income for a family was $32,546. Males had a median income of $32,039 versus $16,583 for females. The per capita income for the village was $14,570. About 16.7% of families and 19.8% of the population were below the poverty line, including 27.2% of those under age 18 and 16.2% of those age 65 or over.

Economy
Although the village's economy was once largely supported by the coal industry, most residents currently seek employment outside village limits in nearby towns and cities such as Moundsville and Wheeling, West Virginia.

Education
Powhatan Point currently has a K-8 elementary school.  After elementary promotion, the majority of students attend River High School (located in Hannibal, Ohio), an institution consolidated with other small Ohio-River villages such as Clarington, Sardis, Hannibal, Langes and Cameron.

Powhatan Point has a public library, a branch of the Belmont County District Library.

See also
 List of cities and towns along the Ohio River

References

External links
 Martins Ferry Public Library - Powhatan Point Branch

Villages in Belmont County, Ohio
Villages in Ohio
Ohio populated places on the Ohio River
1849 establishments in Ohio
Populated places established in 1849